Chade Fallstar is a fictional character in The Realm of the Elderlings, a series of nine novels written by Robin Hobb (a pseudonym of Margaret Ogden).

In features, he is very much a Farseer (his brother Shrewd especially resembled him in later life), although, it is noted, his eyes are a surprising green (most Farseer eyes are dark). When he is first introduced, his life consists largely of a secret chamber, "good food and wine, and a weasel for a companion", and secret missions for the King.

Early life

The elder half-brother of King Shrewd, Chade Fallstar was the son of King Bounty (Shrewd's father), and a (female) soldier, conceived out of wedlock whilst the army of The Six Duchies was on a campaign in the Sandsedge region. The soldier married a man, and died when Chade was still a child: at which point, the husband set his stepson upon a mule with a necklace that had belonged to Chade's mother, and sent the child to Buckkeep.

Upon arriving at Buckkeep, the King recognised Chade as his son, and provided for his education, raising him as a noble, and also beginning the boy's training as an assassin. He was not, however, taught The Skill, an ancient set of abilities based on mental contact and manipulation, which was inherent in the royal line: this deprival would leave him very bitter in later life. He did, however, learn to Scry in bowls of water. Chade's mentor died sometime before he reached fifteen. By adulthood, Chade's life was divided between his public and private personae: in public, he was a foppish, handsome young man, fond of luxury, and, he claimed many years later, vainer than his nephew Regal; in private, however, he was the King's private emissary, sent to kill or harm enemies of the King, or obstacles to power and peace. To add to this dichotomy, he was also "a kindly step-uncle" to his royal nephews, Chivalry and Verity, who "watched over them" (presumably he ensured that they weren't threatened or poisoned).

This split of appearances did not last long, however: whilst still a young man, Chade was badly scarred when a potion he was brewing exploded, terribly marking his face and hands. Ashamed of his appearance, Chade retreated into private, hidden chambers within the castle, and later claimed to have wished himself dead. For months, refused to leave his chambers; when he finally did, he wore disguises that covered his face and hands, to hide the scarring. He then left Buckkeep for "a long time", and when he returned, he found himself considered dead by the court, and felt that he would be more useful to the King without a public face. Thereafter, when sent to do his assassins duties, he would either go by stealth, or in the guise of "Lady Thyme", a cantankerous and repellant elderly lady, who would not be suspected by any. His retreat into isolation was not, as he thought, unnoticed or unmourned; Chivalry and Verity, who had both been fond of him, were both upset by his absence. Regal, however, never knew him: Chade was already scarred and departed when King Shrewd married Lady Desire of Farrow, and since the lady had a fear of malformed persons, he was not introduced to her or to her son after he returned.

As the Royal Assassin, Chade was bound to serve the King; first his father, King Bounty, and then his brother, King Shrewd. It was also a part of his role to be introduced and explained to the King-in-Waiting, in line with the Preparation of a King-in-Waiting to take the throne. Accordingly, when Prince Chivalry reached the age of sixteen, and was made King-in-Waiting, Chade was revealed to him, and the Prince was told how to find Chade in the castle; the Prince in turn revealed that he remembered and had missed him, which shocked Chade. Chivalry chose to act upon this information the very same night: he and Verity (whom Chivalry had disobediently informed of Chade's existence) made their way to Chade's private quarters to visit him. He was shocked and annoyed by this intrusion, and scolded them: he tried to impress upon them, with great difficulty, that they could not call upon him whenever they wished.

Fitz's Apprenticeship

For many years, Chade had no apprentice; however, when Chivalry's illegitimate son (Fitz, but called "boy" by Chade) was brought to Buckkeep and taken under the protection of the King, Chade was ordered to train the boy to succeed him as Royal Assassin. This Chade did, although not always willingly: he made a point of ensuring that the boy knew exactly what he was being trained for, and on one occasion rebelled against a command from Shrewd to ostracise the boy as a test.

Fitz, his apprentice, did not at first realise Chade's illegitimate Farseer origins, having not realised that Chade was at all related; when Fitz did guess (after Chade referred to himself as a Farseer), he amused Chade by guessing "You're Shrewd's son!" He was swiftly corrected by Chade, who commented, "How [Shrewd] would scowl" if he had heard such a comment (Chade appears just as old as Shrewd and is several years older).

Chade seems to have been saddened by the downfall, removal and eventual death of his nephew, King-in-Waiting Chivalry; this did not stop him giving warnings to Chivalry's son whenever he perceived the boy to be at risk (for example, warning him not to expect to become an assistant to the Court Scribe, Fedwren), or from protecting the new King-in-Waiting, Verity.

The Outislander Threat
For some years prior to the Mountain Marriage, the Six Duchies had been under fierce attack by Red Ship Raiders, fierce warriors from the Outislands who had begun by making attacks on the coastal towns and farms, and who progressed to Forging the populations of towns they attacked. Chade was despatched to Forge, the first town to be so attacked (hence the name of the process), to investigate what had happened, and he took Fitz with him. It was there he was first given suspicion of Fitz's possession of the Wit, when Fitz informed him that the Forged people had no sense of community; in the process, Chade was accidentally seen by unForged villagers, leading them to spread to tales of "The Pocked Man" (a mythical Harbinger of Disaster and Misery, whom Chade resembles due to his accident) walking in the kingdom.

Gradually, Chade came to care for his great-nephew, who became more inured in his apprenticeship as he became older. Therefore, when his apprentice was despatched to the Mountain Kingdom with Prince Regal and the royal party intending to celebrate the wedding of the Mountain Princess Kettricken to King-in-Waiting Verity, with orders to assassinate Prince Rurisk (heir to the Mountain Kingdom), Chade's concern over not being appointed to commit the deed, and his worry over entrusting the task to an apprentice, was heightened by his emotional connection to the boy. His concerns proved justified: Regal had manipulated events in the Mountain Kingdom to make the murder of Rurisk seem appropriate, and then to frame Fitz for the murder (after circumstance made it impossible for Fitz to carry it out without being caught). Furthermore, Regal's plots appeared partly encouraged by the King, and had been part of a plan between Regal and Galen, the Skillmaster, to murder Verity. These circumstances left Fitz furious with Regal, and doubtful of the King; Chade, however, counseled caution and loyalty to the royal family.

After Queen-in-Waiting Kettricken comes to court, Chade orders Fitz to protect her, and to give her good counsel when she needs it. Having discovered Fitz's affections for Molly Chandler, he warns Fitz that he cannot expect to lead a life not sanctioned by the King, but that Fitz should aim to gain Kettricken's support: she could be a powerful ally for Fitz if he wishes to marry Molly.

Literary characters introduced in 1995
Characters in American novels of the 20th century